Ndéye Séne (born 18 January 1988) is a Senegalese basketball player for DUC Dakar and the Senegalese national team.

She participated at the 2017 Women's Afrobasket.

References

External links

1988 births
Living people
Senegalese expatriate basketball people in Ivory Coast
Guards (basketball)
Senegalese expatriate basketball people in Romania
Senegalese women's basketball players
Sportspeople from Saint-Louis, Senegal